Elif Kızılkaya (born 1991 in Erzurum, Turkey) is a Turkish curler.

She curls in the Atatürk University's team in Erzurum.

Kızılkaya was admitted to the Turkish women's national team, which debuted at the 2010 European Curling Championships. She competed also in the 2012 European Mixed Curling Championship. She skips for the national team at the European Curling Championships-Group B in Karlstad, Sweden.

Achievements

References

External links
 

1991 births
Sportspeople from Erzurum
Living people
Atatürk University alumni
Turkish female curlers
21st-century Turkish women